Hantos is a village in Fejér county, Hungary.

References

External links 
 Street map 

Populated places in Fejér County